Mustafa Altıntaş (1 January 1939 – 10 November 2010), otherwise known as Mustafa Köylü, was a Turkish footballer who played for Bursaspor and Kocaelispor.

Death
Mustafa died of cancer in Kartepe, Turkey on 10 November 2010.

Personal life
Mustafa's sons Yusuf Altıntaş and Yaşar Altıntaş, and his grandson Batuhan Altıntaş all have played professional football in the Turkish Süper Lig.

References

External links
 

Turkish footballers
Bursaspor footballers
Kocaelispor footballers
Süper Lig players
TFF First League players
Association football forwards
1939 births
2010 deaths
People from Kartepe